Tabarestan Higher Education Institution (TU) (also called Tabarestan University) is an institution of higher education in Formal sciences, Physical sciences, Social sciences, Behavioral sciences and Engineering in Chaloos, Iran. The institution is located in Chaloos near Caspian Sea and Caspian Hyrcanian mixed forests and beside Nowshahr port.

Tabarestan (TU) provides both undergraduate and graduate programs in 5 main departments. Undergraduate admission to Tabarestan is limited to students who pass the National University Entrance Exam  administered yearly by Ministry of Science.

History
The institution was first founded in 1998 with the name Tabarestan Higher Education Institution fully accredited by Ministry of Science. Through the National University Entrance Exam conducted by Ministry of Science, about 100 students were accepted to attend undergraduate courses in the two fields of Management and Computer Engineering from the academic year 1997-1998.

Campus

The main campus of the Institution of Tabarestan's is in Chaloos, Iran. It is located close to Caspian Sea coast in 17th Shahrivar St of Chaloos City.

Buildings
Central office
Central Department
Central library
The Mosque
The gym
The Laboratory
The Scientific Committees
The Restaurant & Buffet
The Robotic

Central office
The central office of Tabarestan is located in San'at Sq. in Tehran, Iran.

Faculties & Departments

Engineering Department
Software Engineering

Formal sciences Department
Mathematics
Applied Mathematics
Computer science

Physical sciences Department
geography
Geomorphology
geography and city programming

Behavioral sciences Department
Psychology

Social sciences Department
Law
Management
Accounting

Robotic
Robotic Center of Tabarestan Higher Education Institution is one of the Center of Excellence in Iran

Student life

Most of the students who study in Tabarestan are happy.

Cost of living
Cost of living in Chaloos is high.

Region
Most of the year the weather is raining.

Tuition fees
Tuition fees are lower than Islamic Azad University in Iran.

Student residences
Tabarestan helps students with accommodation, though most of the students rent privately in Chaloos or Nowshahr (Nowshahr port is beside Chaloos city).

Activities
Tabarestan offers some classes for students like Music classes, Acting, Handwriting, etc.

Competitions
There are several competitions in Tabarestan especially:
Football Cup
Writing story
Writing poem
Software programming
...

Ceremonies
There are several ceremonies during the year with playing music, singing, playing, ...

See also

Higher education in Iran
List of universities in Iran

References

External links
Tabarestan Higher Education Institution's home page
Robotic Center of Tabarestan Higher Education Institution's home page (RCT)
Website of Ministry of Science

Universities in Iran
Chalus, Iran
Education in Mazandaran Province
Buildings and structures in Mazandaran Province